This is a list of prefects of Osijek-Baranja County.

Prefects of Osijek-Baranja County (1993–present)

See also
Osijek-Baranja County

Notes

External links
World Statesmen - Osijek-Baranja County

Osijek-Baranja County